The Diocese of Liverpool is a Church of England diocese based in Liverpool, covering Merseyside north of the River Mersey, part of West Lancashire, part of Wigan in Greater Manchester, Widnes and part of Warrington and  in Cheshire (it was originally formed from the then West Derby hundred of the historic county of Lancashire).  The cathedral is Liverpool Cathedral and the bishop is the Bishop of Liverpool. The diocese was formed on 9 April 1880 from part of the Diocese of Chester.

Bishops
The diocese's House of Bishops comprises the diocesan Bishop of Liverpool (John Perumbalath), the suffragan Bishop of Warrington (Bev Mason), and the honorary assistant bishop (since 1999) and pro-vice chancellor emeritus at Liverpool Hope University, Ian Stuart (a former Assistant Bishop of North Queensland.) Alternative episcopal oversight (for parishes in the diocese who reject the ministry of priests who are women) is provided by the provincial episcopal visitor (PEV) the Bishop suffragan of Beverley, Glyn Webster. He is licensed as an honorary assistant bishop of the diocese in order to facilitate his work there.

There are two retired bishops living in the diocese:
 Cyril Ashton, a retired former Bishop suffragan of Doncaster, has been a licensed as an honorary assistant bishop since his 2011 retirement to Lancaster, Lancashire (in Blackburn diocese, where he is also licensed.)
Frank Sargeant, former Bishop at Lambeth lives in Salford, Greater Manchester (and is also licensed in that diocese.)

In May 2016, it was announced that Susan Goff, Suffragan Bishop of Virginia, had been licensed as an honorary assistant bishop (called "Assisting Bishop of Liverpool") in the diocese, as part of the companion link with the American Episcopalian Diocese of Virginia. In response, the Diocese of Akure, Nigeria, has indicated that they wish to end their part of the companion link.

Archdeaconries and deaneries 

1named Sefton until 2012

2named Bootle until 2017

References
 Church of England Statistics 2002

External links
Diocese of Liverpool official website

 
Liverpool
Religion in Liverpool